The Beale Mountains are located in the Mojave National Preserve in eastern California. The range is one of the smallest mountain ranges in the United States, and is only about 2.5 miles long. The mountains are located northeast of the Kelso Mountains, about five miles from the Kelso Cima road, in the Cinder Cone National Natural Landmark. The mountains lie in the arid climate zone, characterized by little rainfall. They are named after Edward Fitzgerald Beale.

References

Mountain ranges of the Mojave Desert
Mojave National Preserve
Mountain ranges of San Bernardino County, California